The blue star tattoo legend is an urban legend which states that a temporary lick-and-stick tattoo soaked in LSD and made in the form of a blue star, or of popular children's cartoon characters, is being distributed to unknowing children in any given area.

Propagation
The legend commonly surfaces in American elementary and middle schools in the form of a flyer which is distributed to parents by concerned school officials. In the past it was often in the form of poor quality photocopy, clearly many generations old, but it has now also become popular on Internet mailing lists and websites.

The legend states that a temporary lick-and-stick tattoo soaked in LSD and made in the form of a blue star (the logo of the Dallas Cowboys is often mentioned), or of popular cartoon characters, such as Mickey Mouse and Bart Simpson, is being distributed to children in the area in order to get them "addicted to LSD" (even though LSD is rarely addictive).

Generally some attribution is given, typically to a well-regarded hospital or a vaguely specified "advisor to the president", and instructions are given that parents should contact police if they come across the blue star tattoos.

Origin
The legend possibly originated from the fact that an LSD solution is sometimes sold on blotter paper with various designs, including cartoons.

No actual cases of LSD distribution to children in this manner have been documented. Although LSD does not penetrate through skin in sufficient quantities so as to induce a psychedelic experience, the concern was over children licking the tattoo paper before transferring to the skin.

Other countries
The legend has surfaced in many other places, including:
 Brazil
 Italy
 Peru
 Mexico
 Portugal
 Sweden
 UK
 Germany

See also
Bananadine
Lysergic acid diethylamide
Misconceptions about drugs
Moral panic
Poisoned candy myths
Strawberry Quik meth myth
Urban legends about drugs

References

External links
Snopes.com article
The blue star tattoo legend

Urban legends
Lysergic acid diethylamide